Growlanser Generations is both a collection of Growlanser II and Growlanser III and the sole North American release of both games. The North American localizations of both games were produced by Working Designs. This is also the last video game Working Designs released in the U.S. before they became defunct in December 2005.

Growlanser Generations is not to be confused with Growlanser V: Generations, the Japanese name of the fifth entry in the Growlanser series.

Development 
Growlanser Generations can be considered an American version of the 2003 Growlanser Collection, which contained Growlanser I, II & III. However, Growlanser II and Growlanser III were originally planned for separate American releases by Working Designs. Due to opposition from Sony, Working Designs was forced to release both games together.

Differences 
The versions of Growlanser II and III presented in Growlanser Generations are slightly different from their Japanese counterparts. Working Designs opted to add an Auto-Battle feature to both games, as well as enhanced voice acting options, such as the ability to switch voice acting on or off for specific characters. Each game also has a newly added gallery of artwork, vocal outtakes (a staple of Working Designs titles), and music available upon completion.

The deluxe version also included:

- A game-themed analog watch and case.

- A game-based ring, chain, and storage pouch.

- A deck of playing cards with a case and customized artwork (Customized artwork is limited to the case, the back of the cards, and the Jokers).

- A soundtrack with over 20 specially arranged themes.

See also 
 Growlanser II and Growlanser III for more information pertaining to the individual games.

2004 video games
Role-playing video games
Growlanser
PlayStation 2 games
PlayStation 2-only games
Tactical role-playing video games
Sega video game compilations
Working Designs
Atlus games
Fantasy video games
Video games developed in Japan
Video games with isometric graphics
Video games with cel-shaded animation
Romance video games
Dating sims
Single-player video games
North America-exclusive video games
Career Soft games